Daeduk College is a private technical college in the Yuseong-gu district of Daejeon, a major city of South Korea.  The current president is Han Sung-dong (한숭동).   The college employs about 100 instructors.

Academics

Academic offerings are divided among divisions of 
Engineering 
Humanities
Social Science
Arts

History

The school opened in 1980 as Chungnam-Gyeongsang Technical College (충남경상전문대학).

See also
Education in South Korea
List of colleges and universities in South Korea

External links
Official school website(Korean) 
Official school website(English) 

Vocational education in South Korea
Universities and colleges in Daejeon
Educational institutions established in 1980
1980 establishments in South Korea